Rubus insons is a North American species of flowering plants in the rose family. It has been found only in the States of New York, Connecticut, Massachusetts, Vermont, and New Hampshire in the northeastern United States.

The genetics of Rubus is extremely complex, so that it is difficult to decide on which groups should be recognized as species. There are many rare species with limited ranges such as this. Further study is suggested to clarify the taxonomy.

References

insons
Plants described in 1932
Flora of the Northeastern United States
Flora without expected TNC conservation status